Marinada may refer to:

Marination in cooking
Marinada, choral composition by Catalan composer Antoni Pérez Moya (1884-1964)
"Marinada", song by Catalan singer Marina Rossell